The 1957–58 Bradford City A.F.C. season was the 45th in the club's history.

The club finished 3rd in Division Three North, and reached the 3rd round of the FA Cup.

Sources

References

Bradford City A.F.C. seasons
Bradford City